Amerila roseomarginata is a moth of the subfamily Arctiinae first described by Walter Rothschild in 1910. It is found in Nigeria, Kenya, Zaire, Ivory Coast, Ghana, Benin, Gabon, Kenya, Tanzania and Eritrea.

References

Moths described in 1910
Amerilini
Moths of Africa